Delta Lake is located in Grand Teton National Park, in the U.S. state of Wyoming. Delta Lake is situated in Glacier Gulch and is fed rock flour (glacial silt) from the Teton Glacier, which turns the water turquoise in appearance. It has been an increasingly popular hiking destination in the park, with the number of hikers increasing 164% from 2016 to 2018. The easiest walk to the lake is by way of the a hike commencing from the Lupine Meadows trailhead. Following the trail to Surprise and Amphitheater Lakes and an off trail effort to the north from Surprise Lake provides access to Delta Lake. Below Delta Lake lies Glacier Falls, an intermittent  waterfall.

References

Lakes of Grand Teton National Park
Glacial lakes of the United States